Reverend Dugald Macfadyen MA, FRHistS, (25 December 1867 – 23 July 1936), was a British Clergyman, Liberal Party candidate and writer.

Background
Macfadyen was born the son of John Allison Macfadyen and Elizabeth Anderson. He was educated at Manchester Grammar School, Merton College, Oxford and Mansfield College, Oxford. In 1894 he married Mary Olivia Goulty. They had one son and two daughters. She died in 1912. In 1915 he married Edith Barnett Bates.

Political career
Macfadyen was First Secretary of the Council for Higher Education in North Staffordshire. He was a member of Hanley County Borough Education Committee. He was Chairman of the League of Nations Union, Letchworth Branch. He was Liberal candidate for the Hitchin division of Hertfordshire at the 1923 General Election. This was a safe Unionist seat that no Liberal had won since 1906. In fact no Liberal had even run since 1911. It was however his local constituency. He did manage to capture nearly a quarter of the vote and nearly out-polled the socialist who had come second in 1922. In the 1924 General Election he again fought Hitchin, but in a bad year for the Liberals, his vote dropped. He was Liberal candidate for the Reading division of Berkshire at the 1929 General Election. No Liberal candidate had stood at the previous election and the last Liberal to contest the division came a poor third in 1923. The Liberals had not won reading since 1910 so this was not fertile territory. He finished third, matching the vote share of the 1923 Liberal candidate. He did not contest the 1931 General Election. He returned to the political fray as Liberal candidate in the 1934 Cambridge by-election. No Liberal had stood in 1931 and the last Liberal candidate in 1929 polled 25%, finishing third. The Liberals had not won Cambridge since 1906, so there could not have been much optimism about his prospects. He finished a poor third, polling just 7%. He did not contest the 1935 General Election.

Electoral record

Publications
Education: Methods and Ideas
Sir Ebenezer Howard and the Town Planning Movement, 1933
Alfred the West Saxon King of the English, 1901
Life and Letters of Alexander Mackennal, 1905
Story of Andrew Swan
He was also a contributor to the Encyclopædia Britannica.

References

1867 births
1936 deaths
Liberal Party (UK) parliamentary candidates
People educated at Manchester Grammar School
Alumni of Merton College, Oxford
Alumni of Mansfield College, Oxford
Fellows of the Royal Historical Society